The Beechcraft Plainsman was a car made in 1946 by the Beech Aircraft Company in Wichita, Kansas. The Plainsman was fitted with an air cooled four cylinder Franklin engine driving a generator, which in turn powered four electric motors, one for each wheel. It was fitted with fully independent air suspension. It also had an aluminum body. Only two were built.

References

External links
1946 Beechcraft Plainsman Concept Car, Editors of Consumer Guide

Concept cars
First car made by manufacturer

Motor vehicle manufacturers based in Kansas